Robert Joseph "R. J." Harrison (born March 14, 1954 at Long Beach, California) is an American front-office executive in Major League Baseball. He was the director of amateur scouting of the Tampa Bay Rays from  through , and has since served the Rays as senior advisor for scouting and baseball operations. He is the son of longtime Seattle Mariners scout Bob Harrison.

R. J. Harrison is a former minor league pitcher and catcher. He graduated from Robert A. Millikan Senior High School of Long Beach in 1972 and attended Arizona State University, where he played catcher on the Sun Devils' varsity baseball team from 1973–1975.

Harrison turned professional with the St. Louis Cardinals as a catcher in 1975, but by the middle of his second season in the Redbird farm system he had converted to pitcher. In  he had his finest season as a professional, winning 14 games, with a 2.45 earned run average and 16 complete games with the St. Petersburg Cardinals of the Class A Florida State League. But his pitching career was derailed by injuries. In  he landed on the disabled list of the Double-A Arkansas Travelers  for the last six weeks of the season, and was released by the Cardinals prior to the  campaign.

He managed in the minor leagues through 1987 for Seattle and the San Francisco Giants, winning the 1987 California League championship with the Fresno Giants, before becoming a scout. He joined the Tampa Bay organization in 1995, three years before its first MLB team played an official game.

References

1954 births
Living people
Arkansas Travelers players
Baseball executives
Chattanooga Lookouts managers
Gulf Coast Cardinals players
Lynn Sailors players
Major League Baseball scouting directors
Major League Baseball scouts
New York Mets scouts
Baseball players from Long Beach, California
Sportspeople from Long Beach, California
St. Petersburg Cardinals players
Spokane Indians players
Tampa Bay Devil Rays scouts
Tampa Bay Devil Rays executives
Tampa Bay Rays executives